Richard le Despenser, 4th Baron Burghersh (1396–1414) was the son and heir of Thomas le Despenser, 1st Earl of Gloucester (1373–1400), by Constance of York. Constance was a daughter of Edmund of Langley, Duke of York, fourth surviving son of Edward III of England, and Isabella of Castile, a daughter of Peter of Castile. 
He was married to his 2nd cousin Lady Eleanor Neville (a granddaughter of John of Gaunt, a brother of Edmund of York), but died young without leaving issue. His heir was his younger sister Isabel, who married successively Earl of Worcester, and then his cousin, Richard de Beauchamp, 13th Earl of Warwick.

His widow Eleanor, Lady Burghersh remarried to Henry Percy, 2nd Earl of Northumberland.

Ancestry 

1396 births
1414 deaths
14th-century English nobility
15th-century English nobility
Richard
Barons Burghersh
Lords of Glamorgan